Tobias Mørch Kongstad (born 14 September 1996) is a Danish professional racing cyclist, who currently rides for UCI Continental team . In October 2020, he rode in the 2020 Three Days of Bruges–De Panne race in Belgium.

Major results
2014
 1st Stage 1 Oberösterreich Juniorenrundfahrt
2017
 1st Overall Randers Bike Week
1st Stage 2
2018
 1st Overall Post Cup
 5th Scandinavian Race Uppsala
2021
 10th Fyen Rundt
 10th Route Adélie
2022
 3rd Arno Wallaard Memorial

References

External links
 

1996 births
Living people
Danish male cyclists
Cyclists from Copenhagen